Brian Gottfried was the defending champion but lost in the quarterfinals to Peter Fleming.

Roscoe Tanner won in the final 6–1, 7–6 against Raúl Ramirez.

Seeds

  Brian Gottfried (quarterfinals)
  Eddie Dibbs (second round)
  Manuel Orantes (quarterfinals)
  Raúl Ramirez (final)
  Ilie Năstase (quarterfinals)
  Harold Solomon (third round)
  Sandy Mayer (first round)
  Roscoe Tanner (champion)
  Jaime Fillol (third round)
  Phil Dent (first round)
  Stan Smith (third round)
  John Alexander (first round)
  Tim Gullikson (second round)
  Cliff Drysdale (second round)
  José Higueras (second round)
  John Newcombe (first round)

Draw

Finals

Top half

Section 1

Section 2

Bottom half

Section 3

Section 4

References
 1978 American Airlines Tennis Games Draw - Men's Singles

American Airlines Tennis Games - Singles